Carlos "Chino" Morán Benavides (1878 - death date unknown) was a Cuban baseball third baseman and outfielder in the Cuban League and Negro leagues. 

A native of Matanzas, Cuba, Morán was the older brother of fellow ballplayer Francisco Morán. He played from 1902 to 1914 with several ballclubs, including the Fe club, Habana, Carmelita, and the Cuban Stars (West). He was elected to the Cuban Baseball Hall of Fame in 1945.

References

External links

1878 births
Cuban League players
Club Fé players
Habana players
Carmelita players
Cuban Stars (West) players
San Francisco Park players
Punzo players
Year of death missing
Cuban expatriate baseball players in the United States